Le Bossu is a French-Italian adventure film starring Jean Marais and directed by André Hunebelle.  The film also featured Bourvil, possibly the most popular French comedian of the time.  So successful was the formula that Hunebelle teamed up the same two actors for his next adventure film, Captain Blood.

Plot
Duke Philippe de Nevers (Hubert Noël) is an influential and popular man who is married to a beautiful wife called Isabelle (Sabine Sesselmann). His rival Philippe de Gonzague (François Chaumette) hates him enough to organise an attempt on him. The Duke is accompanied by Henri de Lagardère (Jean Marais) when de Gonzague's henchmen altogether attack him. Lagardère cannot save his friend because the both of them are hopelessly outnumbered. He has to escape in order to save the Duke's daughter and swears revenge. Together with his old buddy Passepoil (Bourvil) he raises the little girl in Spain. At the same time he returns frequently to France where he detects confronts his friend's murderers and puts them to the sword one by one until only their former leader is left. Finally he discovers that Philippe de Gonzague is the man for whom he is looking.

Production
The film was shot between May 19 and July 28 in the "Franstudio" of Saint-Maurice and in the  Pyrénées-Orientales. The scene showing how three henchmen are sent to Spain for Lagardère and the duke's daughter were  shot at the Pont du Diable (Céret).
Maître d'armes André Gardère was the accountable instructor concerning the  choreography of all  fencing scenes. 
Guy Delorme, who would play Comte de Rochefort in Bernard Borderie's 1961 version of The Three Musketeers appears here as a henchman.
Sabine Sesselmann was dubbed by Gilberte Aubry (as Aurore de Nevers) and Jacqueline Porel (as Isabelle de Caylus).

Cast

See also
 On Guard (1997)

References

This article incorporates information from the French Wikipedia.

External links

Films directed by André Hunebelle
1959 films
1950s historical adventure films
French historical adventure films
Italian historical adventure films
1950s French-language films
Films based on French novels
Films shot in France
French swashbuckler films
Films set in the 1710s
Films set in the 1700s
Italian swashbuckler films
1950s Italian films
1950s French films